Neil Alexander Purvis (31 January 1953 – 26 October 2008) was a New Zealand rugby union player. A second five-eighth and wing, Purvis represented Wairarapa Bush and Otago at a provincial level, and was a member of the New Zealand national side, the All Blacks, in 1976. He played 12 matches for the All Blacks including one international.

Purvis was also a noted breeder and owner of thoroughbred racehorses, his horse Cluden Creek winning the 2004 Wellington Cup.  He farmed Cluden Station near Tarras in Central Otago, and died there in 2008 while attempting to rescue cattle from a bog.

References

1953 births
2008 deaths
New Zealand farmers
New Zealand international rugby union players
New Zealand racehorse owners and breeders
New Zealand rugby union players
Otago rugby union players
People educated at John McGlashan College
Rugby union centres
Rugby union players from Cromwell, New Zealand
Rugby union wings
Wairarapa Bush rugby union players